Alfrēds Hartmanis (November 1, 1881 in Riga, Latvia – July 27, 1927 in Riga, Latvia) was a Latvian chess player who won the Baltic Chess Congress in 1913.

Career
In 1900 Hartmanis became the Riga chess club member. In 1910 he participated in strong chess tournament in Warsaw and scored 9/15, with Akiba Rubinstein winning. In 1912 the All-Russian Masters Tournament in Vilno Hartmanis scored 10½/19.

In 1913 Hartmanis enjoyed the greatest success in his chess player career, with 11½/14 winning the VI Baltic Chess Congress in Mitau. After the World War I actively engaged in Latvian chess life's recovery, achieving good results in tournaments. In 1924 he participated in first Latvian Chess Championship and finished fourth behind Hermanis Matisons, Fricis Apšenieks and Kārlis Bētiņš. In 1926 in second Latvian Chess Championship Hartmanis placed fifth behind Apšenieks, Teodors Bergs, Vladimirs Petrovs and Augusts Strautmanis.

For many years Hartmanis worked as a tutor, but in 1920s few years served as a tax official.

References

External links
  player profile at chess-db.com
 An obituary in the newspaper «Latvis», 05.08.1927 (in Latvian).

Latvian chess players
1881 births
1927 deaths